Curena costipunctata is a species of moth of the family Pyralidae. It is found in Taiwan.

References

Moths described in 1928
Pyralini